Khevin Pratt (born May 16, 1970) is a former American football wide receiver who played five seasons in the Arena Football League with the Charlotte Rage, Nashville Kats, Milwaukee Mustangs, New York CityHawks and Portland Forest Dragons. He played college football at California State University, Chico. He was also a member of the Sacramento Gold Miners of the Canadian Football  League.

References

External links
Just Sports Stats

Living people
1970 births
Players of American football from Los Angeles
American football wide receivers
Chico State Wildcats football players
Sacramento Gold Miners players
Charlotte Rage players
Nashville Kats players
Milwaukee Mustangs (1994–2001) players
New York CityHawks players
Portland Forest Dragons players